, also known as Chidori RSC, is a Japanese shooting sport four-panel manga series by Salmiakki. It was serialized online via Shueisha's Tonari no Young Jump website from April 2015 to July 2020, and was collected in six tankōbon volumes. An anime television series adaptation by studio 3Hz aired from October 2019 to January 2020.

Plot
Hikari Kokura, a passionate marksman enrolls at Chidori High School, which has a target shooting club, but discovers the club was dissolved due to a lack of members. She restarts the club by finding three new members to join her, with the goal of making it into a national competition.

Characters

Chidori High School

A member of the Chidori High School Shooting Club. She enrolled herself at Chidori High School solely because of its Rifle Shooting Club. Hikari has a carefree and cheerful spirit although she is capable of doing everything to reach her goals when she is motivated. She is constantly trying to improve her shooting skills to fulfil her dreams of entering the Olympics.

A member of the Chidori High School Rifle Shooting Club and the childhood friend of Hikari Kokura. She is a gentle and supportive friend who loves reading. She is also to be a good cook as Hikari uses her treats as motivation when she is feeling tired during shooting practice. She is described by Hikari as super level headed and totally dependable.

A member of the Chidori High School Rifle Shooting Club. She is a skilled rifle shooter. She is a graceful and popular girl who easily leads the club, even though Hikari Kokura was the one who re-founded it. She also is rather vain as she often relishes in her own beauty and skills.

A member of the Chidori High School Rifle Shooting Club. She is not expressive and is usually poker-faced. However, she does appear to be very charming when she does show emotions. It is said that watching her shoot is similar to watching precision machinery as her shots are always accurate and on point.

A teacher at Chidori High School and the advisor for the Rifle Shooting Club.

Asaka Academy

The president of the Asaka Academy Rifle Shooting Club and Erika's cousin. Erika contacted her to arrange a practice match to prepare for the High School Rifle Shooting Competition.

The vice president of the Asaka Academy Rifle Shooting Club.

A first-year student at Asaka Academy and a member of the academy's Rifle Shooting Club. She shows commitment to practising and speaks well of others when observing them. She is polite and courteous.

A first-year student who is seen with Karen Sakashita during practice at Asaka Academy Rifle Shooting Club.

Other characters

The president of Kiritani First High School Rifle Shooting club.

One of Hikari's classmates. They have lunch and talk with each other quite often.

One of Hikari's classmates. They have lunch and talk with each other quite often. She is a member of the Tracking Club.

One of the teachers in Chidori High School.

Media

Manga
Rifle is Beautiful, written and illustrated by Salmiakki, began on Shueisha's Tonari no Young Jump website on April 9, 2015, and it ended on July 2, 2020. Shueisha has compiled and published its chapters into six individual tankōbon volumes from May 19, 2016 to September 18, 2020.

Volume list

Anime
An anime adaptation was announced in the 46th issue of Weekly Young Jump magazine on October 18, 2018. The series was animated by studio 3Hz and directed by Masanori Takahashi, with Tatsuya Takahashi handling series composition, and Ken Mukaigawara designing the characters. It aired from October 13, 2019 to January 18, 2020 on Tokyo MX, SUN, KBS, and BS11. Sentai Filmworks has licensed the anime in North America under the title Chidori RSC. The series ran for 12 episodes.

Episode list

Reception
Anime News Network had four editors review the first episode of the anime: Theron Martin found the artistic qualities "nothing special" but gave praise to the main cast's comedic delivery and detailed information about laser-target rifles, calling it a "light-hearted diversion with enough humor to make it work." James Beckett found the plot, characters and production overall to be "blandly competent" and found little interest in the show's subject matter, saying it will probably cater only to an all-girl slice-of-life audience; Nick Creamer commended the "visual execution" of the humor delivered and the camaraderie amongst the main cast feeling believable, but gave note of the "stilted scene transitions, uneven jokes, and total predictability of structure and characterization" throughout the episode, saying it will only appeal to fans of the slice-of-life genre. The fourth reviewer, Rebecca Silverman, felt the plot was barebones and lacked urgency so that the girls' personalities can bounce off one another while using the rifles as more of a background setting.

Notes

References

External links
  
  
 

2019 anime television series debuts
3Hz
Anime series based on manga
Comedy anime and manga
Japanese webcomics
Seinen manga
Sentai Filmworks
Slice of life anime and manga
Shueisha manga
Sports anime and manga
Webcomics in print
Yonkoma